Kevin Onyekachi Amuneke (born 10 May 1986) is a Nigerian footballer who currently play as a forward.

He has previously spent most of his professional career in Europe, mainly in Portugal and Sweden.

Club career
Amuneke was born in Eziobodo. After starting out at S.L. Benfica and FC Porto, representing only the youth teams in the first case and the youths and the reserves in the second, he began his professional career in Sweden with Landskrona BoIS (where he played alongside brother Kingsley) and, after two years, returned to Portugal, appearing for Vitória F.C. in the Primeira Liga.

On 21 May 2007, after cancelling out his contract unilaterally, Amuneke agreed to join PFC CSKA Sofia in Bulgaria for about €400,000. However, he returned to Sweden in December of the same year to play for IFK Norrköping in the top level – the transfer fee was this time reported as €300,000.

After a brief stint in Romania with FC Politehnica Timișoara, Amuneke moved back to Portugal, signing with Madeira's C.D. Nacional in early July 2009. Not having been used at all during the first part of the 2010–11 season, he was released by the club, resuming his career with Östers IF in the Superettan.

Amuneke rarely settled in the following years, representing in quick succession Trelleborgs FF (Sweden), C.D. Tondela (Portugal), FK Sloboda Užice (Serbia) and IS Halmia (Sweden). On 21 December 2016, after a stint at Ballynure Old Boys of the Ballymena & Provincial Football League, he moved to the NIFL Premiership having agreed to a short-term deal at Linfield.

International career
Amuneke won two caps for Nigeria, both during the 2006 FIFA World Cup qualifiers, featuring against Rwanda and Angola in June 2005.

Personal life
Amuneke's older brothers, Emmanuel and Kingsley, were also footballers. The former, a winger, played amongst others for Sporting Clube de Portugal and FC Barcelona, and was also a Nigerian international.

Honours
CSKA Sofia
Bulgarian First League: 2007–08

Linfield
Northern Ireland League: 2016–17
Irish Cup: 2016–17

References

External links
NigerianPlayers profile

1986 births
Living people
Nigerian footballers
Association football forwards
Primeira Liga players
Liga Portugal 2 players
Segunda Divisão players
FC Porto B players
Vitória F.C. players
C.D. Nacional players
C.D. Tondela players
Allsvenskan players
Superettan players
Landskrona BoIS players
IFK Norrköping players
Östers IF players
Trelleborgs FF players
Liga I players
FC Politehnica Timișoara players
First Professional Football League (Bulgaria) players
PFC CSKA Sofia players
Serbian SuperLiga players
FK Sloboda Užice players
NIFL Premiership players
Linfield F.C. players
Nigeria international footballers
Nigerian expatriate footballers
Expatriate footballers in Portugal
Expatriate footballers in Sweden
Expatriate footballers in Bulgaria
Expatriate footballers in Romania
Expatriate footballers in Serbia
Expatriate association footballers in Northern Ireland
Nigerian expatriate sportspeople in Portugal
Nigerian expatriate sportspeople in Sweden
Nigerian expatriate sportspeople in Romania
Portadown F.C. players